is a railway station on the Nemuro Main Line of JR Hokkaido located in Minamifurano, Hokkaidō, Japan.

Railway stations in Hokkaido Prefecture
Railway stations in Japan opened in 1900